is a Japanese footballer who plays for Cerezo Osaka as a right back.

Career
During his time in high school, he was converted from forward to a defending role.

After four years attending the Biwako Seikei Sport College and becoming the side-captain, Matsuda signed for FC Tokyo in 2014. In 2013, he was registered from the club as Special Designated Player.

He decided to leave FC Tokyo after the 2015 season. In January 2016, Matsuda signed with his hometown-club, Cerezo Osaka.

Personal life
His father is Indonesian and his mother is Japanese.
His twin brother Riki is also a soccer player, and is a forward of Ehime FC in J3 League.

Club statistics
Updated to 18 July 2022.

1includes Japanese Super Cup appearances

References

External links

Profile at Cerezo Osaka

1991 births
Living people
Biwako Seikei Sport College alumni
Association football people from Osaka Prefecture
Japanese footballers
Japanese people of Indonesian descent
Sportspeople of Indonesian descent
J1 League players
J2 League players
FC Tokyo players
Cerezo Osaka players
Association football defenders